Jon Robinson may refer to:
Jon Robinson (American football) (born 1976), American football general manager
Jon Robinson (announcer) (born 1960), radio and television personality in Charlotte, North Carolina
Jon-John Robinson (born 1970), American record producer and songwriter

See also
Jonathan Robinson (disambiguation)
John Robinson (disambiguation)